Prince Regent Charles Hospital is a hospital located in Bujumbura, Burundi. It was a gift from Prince Charles, Count of Flanders, having opened in 1949. It was fully public until 1992, when it became a special domain of the state.

References

Hospitals in Burundi